Andover was the name of a constituency of the House of Commons of the Parliament of England from 1295 to 1307, and again from 1586, then of the Parliament of Great Britain from 1707 to 1800 and of the Parliament of the United Kingdom from 1801 to 1918. It was a parliamentary borough in Hampshire, represented by two Members of Parliament until 1868, and by one member from 1868 to 1885. The name was then transferred to a county constituency electing one MP from 1885 until 1918.

History
The parliamentary borough of Andover, in the county of Hampshire (or as it was still sometimes known before about the eighteenth centuries, Southamptonshire), sent MPs to the parliaments of 1295 and 1302–1307. It was re-enfranchised as a two-member constituency in the reign of Elizabeth I of England. It elected MPs regularly from 1586.

The House of Commons decided, in 1689, that the elective franchise for the seat was limited to the twenty four members of the Andover corporation and not the freemen of the borough. This ruling was confirmed after another disputed election in 1727. Matthew Skinner and Abel Kettleby received the most votes, from many householders, but James Brudenell and Charles Colyear (Viscount Milsington) were declared elected for winning the most support from corporation members. Under the Reform Act 1832 the electorate was expanded by allowing householders, whose property was valued at £10 or more, to vote. There were 246 registered electors in 1832.

From the 1868 United Kingdom general election the constituency returned one member. The electorate was further extended, in 1868, to 775 registered electors.

Apart from the period between 1653 and 1658, Andover continued to be represented as a borough constituency until that was abolished in 1885. Immediately thereafter, from the 1885 United Kingdom general election, the town of Andover was combined with surrounding rural territory to form a county division of Hampshire, known formally as the Western or Andover division. The registered electorate for the expanded seat was 9,175 in 1885, and 9,460 in 1901.

The constituency was abolished in 1918, when the Municipal Borough of Andover and Andover Rural District were included in the Basingstoke seat.

Boundaries 
The constituency was based on the northern Hampshire town of Andover.

The Parliamentary Boundaries Act 1832 (2 & 3 William IV, c. 64) defined the seat as "the respective parishes of Andover and Knights Enham, and the tithing of Foxcot". The boundaries were left unaltered, until the end of the borough constituency in 1885.

Under the Redistribution of Seats Act 1885, the county division was defined as including the Sessional Divisions of Andover, and Kingsclere; with parts of the Sessional Divisions of Winchester, Romsey, and Basingstoke, and the Municipal Boroughs of Andover and Winchester, and the parish of Coombe, Hampshire in the Hungerford Sessional Division of Berkshire.

Members of Parliament 
The Roman numerals after some names are to distinguish different members for this constituency, with the same name. It is not suggested this use of Roman numerals was applied at the time.

 In this section by-elections are indicated by an asterisk after the date.

Parliament of England 1586-1707 (two members)
As there were sometimes significant gaps between Parliaments held in this period, the dates of first assembly and dissolution are given. Where the name of the member has not yet been ascertained or (before 1558) is not recorded in a surviving document, the entry unknown is entered in the table.

1707–1868 (two members)

 In this sub-section Liberal MPs elected before the formal founding of the Liberal Party, in 1859, are indicated by a + symbol after the party name.

1868-1918 (one member)

Elections

Elections in the 1830s

Elections in the 1840s

Elections in the 1850s

Elections in the 1860s
Cubitt resigned to contest the 1861 by-election at City of London, causing a by-election.

Coles' death caused a by-election.

Cubitt's death caused a by-election.

Humphery resigned, causing a by-election.

Karslake was appointed Attorney General for England and Wales, requiring a by-election.

The seat was reduced to one member.

Elections in the 1870s

Elections in the 1880s

Elections in the 1890s

Elections in the 1900s

Elections in the 1910s

General Election 1914–15:

Another General Election was required to take place before the end of 1915. The political parties had been making preparations for an election to take place and by the July 1914, the following candidates had been selected; 
Conservative: Walter Faber
Liberal:

Notes

References 
 British Parliamentary Election Results 1832-1885, compiled and edited by F.W.S. Craig (The Macmillan Press 1977) 
D Brunton & D H Pennington, Members of the Long Parliament (London: George Allen & Unwin, 1954)
Cobbett's Parliamentary history of England, from the Norman Conquest in 1066 to the year 1803 (London: Thomas Hansard, 1808) 
 Maija Jansson (ed.), Proceedings in Parliament, 1614 (House of Commons) (Philadelphia: American Philosophical Society, 1988) 
 J E Neale, The Elizabethan House of Commons (London: Jonathan Cape, 1949) 
 J Holladay Philbin, Parliamentary Representation 1832 - England and Wales (New Haven: Yale University Press, 1965)
 The House of Commons 1690-1715, by Eveline Cruickshanks, Stuart Handley and D.W. Hayton (Cambridge University Press 2002) 
 The Parliaments of England by Henry Stooks Smith (1st edition published in three volumes 1844–50), second edition edited (in one volume) by F.W.S. Craig (Political Reference Publications 1973)

Parliamentary constituencies in Hampshire (historic)
Constituencies of the Parliament of the United Kingdom established in 1295
Constituencies of the Parliament of the United Kingdom disestablished in 1918
Andover, Hampshire